Puteri was a Malaysian sitcom-drama directed by Aziz M. Osman and starring Nora Danish as the titular character. It originally aired every Wednesday at 10:00 pm on TV3, from 2005 to 2008.

Premise
The sitcom tells the story of Puteri (Nora Danish), a beautiful girl who, along with her two friends, Kamala (Kanchana Devi Segeran) and Anita (Siti Fazurina), are renting a room in a house belonging to Pak Badar (AR Badul) and his wife, Lilian (Louisa Chong).

Puteri falls for Roslan, a kind-hearted guy who is Pak Badar's driver. Later in the series, Anita leaves for Johor Bahru and is replaced by Nadia, a Singaporean girl who is Pak Badar's niece. Nadia falls for Roslan, too and results in Puteri and Nadia constantly fighting for Roslan. Roslan on the other hand, loves Puteri and not Nadia.

Cast
 Nora Danish - Puteri Farah Nordin
 Kanchana Devi Segeran - Kamala
 Siti Fazurina - Anita (Seasons 1, 2 and 3)
 Melissa Tong - Soo Sans (Seasons 4, 5 and 6)
 Intan Ladyana - Nadia (Seasons 7, 8, 9 and 10)
 Beego - Roslan
 AR Badul - Pak Badar
 Louisa Chong - Lilian
 Awal Ashaari - Helmi (Seasons 4, 6 and 7)

Theme songs
 Sha Na Na - Amy Mastura
 Cinta - Amy Mastura

References 

Malaysian drama television series